In enzymology, a pantetheine kinase is an enzyme that catalyzes the chemical reaction

ATP + pantetheine  ADP + pantetheine 4'-phosphate

Thus, the two substrates of this enzyme are ATP and pantetheine, whereas its two products are ADP and pantetheine 4'-phosphate.

This enzyme belongs to the family of transferases, specifically those transferring phosphorus-containing groups (phosphotransferases) with an alcohol group as acceptor.  The systematic name of this enzyme class is ATP:pantetheine 4'-phosphotransferase. This enzyme is also called pantetheine kinase (phosphorylating).  This enzyme participates in pantothenate and coa biosynthesis.

References 

 

EC 2.7.1
Enzymes of unknown structure